Wart frog may refer to:

 African wart frog, a brightly colored frog
 Amboina wart frog, a frog found in Sulawesi, Molucca Islands, and New Guinea
 Andaman wart frog, a frog endemic to the Andaman Islands, India
 Annam wart frog, a frog found in Cambodia and Vietnam
 Boie's wart frog, a South Asian frog with half-webbed toes
 Bombay wart frog, a frog native to India, Sri Lanka, Pakistan, Nepal and Bangladesh
 Burmese wart frog, a terrestrial frog found in primary tropical forest
 Dammerman's wart frog, a frog endemic to the Lesser Sunda Islands, India
 Finch's wart frog, a frog endemic to Sabah, Malaysia
 Fragile wart frog, a frog endemic to Hainan Island, China
 Ghats wart frog, a frog endemic to the Western Ghats, India
 Inger's wart frog, a frog found in Borneo
 Kerala wart frog, a frog from India
 Koh Chang wart frog, a frog found in Cambodia, Laos, Thailand, and Vietnam
 Luzon wart frog, a frog endemic to the Philippines
 Malabar wart frog, a frog endemic to the Western Ghats, India
 Malaya wart frog, a frog endemic to Sumatra and Java, Indonesia
 Mysore wart frog, a frog endemic to the Western Ghats, India
 Nilgiris wart frog, a frog endemic to the Western Ghats, India
 Parambikulam wart frog, a frog endemic to the Western Ghats, India
 Pegu wart frog, a frog endemic to the Western Ghats, India
 Pierre's wart frog, a frog associated with paddy fields
 Sri Lanka wart frog, a frog endemic to Sri Lanka
 Sulawesi wart frog, a frog endemic to Sulawesi, Indonesia
 Sundas wart frog, a frog found in the Lesser Sunda Islands of Indonesia and East Timor
 Tagibo wart frog, a frog endemic to the Philippines
 Tanah Rata wart frog, a frog endemic to Peninsular Malaysia
 Terai wart frog, a frog associated with open grasslands
 Timor wart frog, a frog endemic to the island of Timor
 Tweedie's wart frog, a frog found in Sumatra and the Malay Peninsula

Animal common name disambiguation pages